Alex Fraser may refer to:

People
Alex Fraser (scientist) (1923–2002), Australian scientist
Alex Fraser (politician) (1916–1989), Canadian politician
Alex Fraser (Australian footballer) (1908–1983), Australian rules footballer for St Kilda
Alex Fraser (Scottish footballer), Scottish footballer for Rangers 
Henry Brinton (1901–1977), who wrote under the pseudonym "Alex Fraser"

Other uses
Alex Fraser Bridge, British Columbia, Canada
Alex Fraser Research Forest, British Columbia, Canada

See also
Fraser (surname)
Alexander Fraser (disambiguation)
Alec Fraser (disambiguation)
Fraser (disambiguation)